José Luis Rodríguez (born July 21, 1963 in Buenos Aires) is an Argentine former footballer who played as a centre-forward. He played for a number of clubs in Argentina, Spain and Ecuador.

Rodríguez, nicknamed El Puma after the singer of the same name, started his professional career in 1984 with Deportivo Español, he went on to become one of the club's all-time best, scoring 63 goals and becoming the top scorer in the Argentine Primera in the 1987–1988 season.

He had a signed contract in Spain with Real Betis before returning to Argentina where he played for Deportivo Español again. then Rosario Central, Racing Club and Olimpo. In 1996, he also signed a contract with Deportivo Cuenca in Ecuador.

Titles

External links
InfoBae article 
Rosario Central profile 

1963 births
Living people
Footballers from Buenos Aires
Argentine footballers
Association football forwards
Deportivo Español footballers
Real Betis players
Rosario Central footballers
Racing Club de Avellaneda footballers
Olimpo footballers
C.D. Cuenca footballers
Argentine Primera División players
Expatriate footballers in Spain
Expatriate footballers in Ecuador